Nelli Vladimirovna Uvarova (born 14 March 1980) is a Russian theater and film actress.

Early life
Nelli Uvarova was born in Mažeikiai, Lithuania to a Russian father and Armenian mother.

Uvarova graduated from the All-Russian State University of Cinematography, one of the most prestigious universities throughout the film industry.

Career
In 1999, Nelly began to appear in the films, including the famous Boomer.

Her debut film was Let’s fly directed by Anna Melikyan. For the role in this film Uvarova was awarded the main prize at the International Institute Film Festival. For the role in the short film On Demand the actress was awarded St. Anna prize.
In 2001, Uvarova joined Russian Academic Youth Theatre, where she played many prominent roles. She played Dorothy in The Wizard of Oz and Natalie Herzen in the play The Coast of Utopia.

However, a one man show Rules of Behavior in Modern Society, became one of her most striking works. For this role, she was awarded the prize of the international festival Rainbow and was also nominated for the Golden Mask award.

The role of a charming ugly girl, (Katya) Yekaterina Pushkareva, in the TV series Not Born Beautiful (2005) became a real breakthrough in Nelly’s career and brought her national love and fame. During the broadcast of the series she had turned into a real star of Russian television. Uvarova played in TV series such as The First Circle (2006), Atlantida (TV series) (2007), Heavy Sand and feature films I Stay, M + F and some others.

She played Natasha in Ex-Wife (Russian TV series) in 2013.  Other television series she acted in include Tower: New People (2012).

In 2007, Uvarova won Lithuanian Kids Choice award for Personality of the Year.

Selected filmography
 Boomer (Russian title: Бумер) (2003) as girl
 Not Born Beautiful (2005) as Yekaterina (Katya) Pushkareva
 The First Circle (2006) as Ninel
 Atlantida (Атлантида) (TV series) (2007) as Vera Stepnova
 I’m Staying (Я остаюсь) (2007) as Evgeniya Tyrsa
 Heavy Sand (Тяжёлый песок) (TV series) (2008) as Dina Ivanovskaya
 Closed Spaces (Закрытые пространства) (2008) as Tamara
 Mysterious Island (2008) as Olga 
 M + F (2009) as Veronika
 Love Journal (2009)
 Close Enemy (2010) as Mariya
 Mommy (2010) as Madina
 Tower: New People (2012) as Larisa
 Ex-Wife (2013) as Natalia (Natasha) Melnik
 The Last Minister (2020) as Tikhomirova

References

External links 

 

Nelli Uvarova at YouTube

1980 births
Living people
Russian film actresses
Russian television actresses
Russian people of Armenian descent
Lithuanian people of Armenian descent
People from Mažeikiai
Gerasimov Institute of Cinematography alumni
20th-century Russian actresses
21st-century Russian actresses